The Budget of His Majesty's Government is an annual budget set by HM Treasury for the following financial year, with the revenues to be gathered by HM Revenue and Customs and the expenditures of the public sector, in compliance with government policy. The budget statement is one of two statements made by the Chancellor of the Exchequer in the House of Commons, with the Spring Statement being made the following year.

Budgets are usually set once every year and are announced in the House of Commons by the Chancellor of the Exchequer. Since autumn 2017 the United Kingdom budget typically takes place in the Autumn in order to allow major tax changes to occur annually, well before the start of the fiscal year. The most recent budget was presented by Rishi Sunak on 27 October 2021. Sunak’s successor, Kwasi Kwarteng, delivered a fiscal event in September 2022. His successor  Jeremy Hunt delivered another fiscal event in November 2022. Although not an official budget statement, they were widely referred to by the media as a "mini-budget".

Budget process 
The UK fiscal year ends on 5 April each year. The financial year ends on 31 March of each year. Thus, the UK budget for financial year 2021 would cover the period from 1 April 2021 to 31 March 2022 and is often referred to as 2021–22.

Historically, the budget was usually released in March, less than one month before the beginning of the new fiscal year. Parliament was not expected to take action on a budget for the fiscal year until the summer, several months after the start of the fiscal year. For that reason, Parliament typically passed a "Vote on Account" in early spring that provided continuity of funding into the new fiscal year, up until the point that the new budget was enacted. The spending authorized in the Vote on Account was normally 45% of the amounts already authorized in the current fiscal year, taking into account the Main Estimates and any revised or Supplementary Estimates already approved by Parliament. Legislative action on the proposed budget generally aligned with the executive's original budget request; failure to carry the budget would regarded as tantamount to a vote of No Confidence in the Government.

Since November 2017 the budget was moved to the Autumn, with a view to passing the Finance Act before the commencement of the Financial Year. Votes on Account should no longer be necessary.

Governmental departments submit their funding requests — called "Main Supply Estimates" – to HM Treasury. The government then releases this data in a large consolidated document titled "Central Government Supply Estimates (Budget Year-Following Year): Main Supply Estimates" 

The government reserves the right to submit "Supplementary Estimates" in the spring and winter of a given fiscal year to update its agencies' spending totals for the current financial year and report any governmental re-organizations. When an agency submits a Supplementary Estimate, it is customary to also submit an "Estimate Memorandum" to the agency's relevant oversight committee in Parliament describing and justifying the changes. This condenses two functions – reporting supplemental spending requests and agency re-organizations.

List of budgets

Differences between the UK and other main economies 
Differences between the UK and United States: 

 The period of fiscal year. The UK fiscal year ends on 5 April each year, while in the United States it begins on 1 October and ends on 30 September the following year.
 The person that the budget document begins with. In the UK, Budgets are usually set once every year and are announced in the House of Commons by the Chancellor of the Exchequer. But, in the United States, it often begins with the President's proposal to Congress recommending funding levels for the next fiscal year.

Differences between the UK and the European Union: 

 The entity that proposes the budget. In the EU, the budget is proposed annually by the European Commission, and reviewed and negotiated by the Council of the European Union (which represents Member States' governments) and the European Parliament (which represents EU citizens).
 In the EU, the annual budget must remain within ceilings determined in advance by the Multiannual Financial Framework, laid down for a (five to) seven-year period.

See also 
 Countries of the United Kingdom by GVA per capita
 United Kingdom national debt
 Budget Day
 Economy of the United Kingdom
 Departments of the United Kingdom Government
 Government spending in the United Kingdom
 Whole of Government Accounts

References

Further reading
 Browning, Peter. The Treasury and Economic Policy: 1964-1985 (Longman, 1986).
 Dell, Edmund. The Chancellors: A History of the Chancellors of the Exchequer, 1945-90 (HarperCollins, 1997) 619pp;  17 chapters covering the terms of each Chancellor.
 Fairclough, Isabela, and Norman Fairclough. "Practical reasoning in political discourse: The UK government’s response to the economic crisis in the 2008 Pre-Budget Report." Discourse & Society 22.3 (2011): 243-268. online
 Walsh, Catherine. "Protesting Too Much: Alastair Darling's constructions after the Financial Crash." Critical Discourse Studies 13.1 (2016): 41-56.
 Woodward, Nicholas. The management of the British economy, 1945-2001 (Manchester University Press, 2004).
 
 

 
Budget